Vendula Hopjáková (born 10 June 1996) is a Czech snowboarder. She competed in the 2018 Winter Olympics. and in the 2022 Winter Olympics, in Women's snowboard cross.

References

1996 births
Living people
Snowboarders at the 2018 Winter Olympics
Snowboarders at the 2022 Winter Olympics
Czech female snowboarders
Olympic snowboarders of the Czech Republic
Sportspeople from Olomouc